Gordon Stewart Johnstone (21 April 1900 – 6 October 1961) was an English professional footballer who played as a centre forward and wing half in the Football League for Brentford.

Career statistics

References

1900 births
People from the Metropolitan Borough of Gateshead
Footballers from Tyne and Wear
1961 deaths
English footballers
Association football wing halves
Association football forwards
Houghton Rovers F.C. players
Brentford F.C. players
Felling Colliery A.F.C. players
English Football League players